Ivan Vasiliyevitch Yershov or Ershov (November 8, 1867 – November 21, 1943), PAU, was a Soviet and Russian opera singer. He earned renown for his brilliant performances at the Mariinsky Theatre in Saint Petersburg, performing some of the most demanding roles written for the dramatic tenor voice.

Career
Yershov was born illegitimate into a poor family in Novocherkassk. He entered the Aleksandrovsk railroad school in 1884 and trained to become a mechanic/engine driver. In his spare time, he sang in choirs. The outstanding potential of his voice was noticed and he received singing lessons in Moscow. In 1888, Anton Rubinstein awarded him a scholarship to the Saint Petersburg Conservatory where he was assigned to the class of the distinguished teacher Stanislav Ivanovich Gabel (1849–1924). He studied, too, with Joseph Palacek at the conservatory.

According to the Concise Oxford Dictionary of Opera at least, Yershov made his operatic debut in Saint Petersburg in 1893 as Gounod's Faust.

The young tenor travelled to Italy the following year to complete his studies in Milan with Ernesto Rossi. While in Italy, he performed at  Turin and at Reggio Emilia, appearing as Don Jose in Carmen and Canio in Pagliacci. He returned to Russia in 1894 and took up an engagement with the Kharkov Opera. Here he sang a variety of roles as diverse as Romeo in Roméo et Juliette, Arturo in I puritani, Samson in Samson and Delilah, Vladimir in Prince Igor and Ernani in Ernani. Yershov met with considerable success at Kharkov, although his voice still exhibited some shortcomings. Such was his promise, however, he was offered a contract by Russia's foremost opera house, the Mariinsky Theatre in Saint Petersburg. His debut as a Mariinsky artist came in the title role of Faust in January 1895.

Yershov's singing continued to grow in size and technical assurance following his arrival at the Mariinsky. Before long, he was being hailed by audiences and music critics alike as Russia's finest dramatic tenor.

He would appear regularly at the Mariinsky in a wide spectrum of operatic works, including Peter Tchaikovsky's masterpiece Eugene Onegin, in which he sang the part of Lenski. He also sang the title roles in Tannhäuser and Lohengrin and appeared as Faust in Mefistofele. The part of Roland in Esclarmonde was added in 1897 to his repertoire. In 1900, he appeared as Tristan in Tristan und Isolde and Raoul in Les Huguenots. He sang the title role in Otello the next year, and that of Siegfried in Siegfried in 1902. He appeared, too, as Radames in Aida and Paolo in Francesca da Rimini in 1904. Other roles which he undertook included John of Leyden, Florestan, Grishka Kuterma, Sobinin, Tsar Berendey, Sadko, Finn, Mikhailo Tucha, Orest, Gvidan and Golitsyn. He also gave concerts featuring vocal music by Tchaikovsky, Modest Mussorgsky, J.S. Bach, G.F. Handel,  Robert Schumann, Hector Berlioz and other prominent composers.

In private life Yershov was a reserved, serious-minded individual who shunned the limelight and was genuinely humble about his achievements. He also disliked travel and when Cosima Wagner asked him in 1901 to sing at the Bayreuth Festival, he declined the invitation on the grounds that he did not wish to restudy his Wagnerian roles in German. (He also feared that his musical interpretations would be stifled by the prevailing Bayreuth style of singing, which preferred Sprechgesang to bel canto.)

Yershov believed strongly that opera was an important art form and not mere entertainment for the wealthy. After the Russian Revolution of 1917, he concentrated most of his energies on producing operatic works and teaching vocal students at the Leningrad (Saint Petersburg) Conservatory, although, in February 1919, he agreed to perform the leading role in a revival of Rimsky-Korsakov's Kashchey the Deathless. He also sang Truffaldino in Prokofiev's The Love for Three Oranges, which received its premiere Russian performance in February 1926 at the Mariinsky (or the "Leningrad State Academic Theatre for Opera and Ballet" as it had been renamed by the Soviet authorities).

Yershov retired from the stage in 1929, having performed in approximately 55 different operas during the course of his career. In 1938, he was made a People's Artist of the Soviet Union and awarded a doctorate of musicology three years later. He was evacuated to Tashkent in Uzbekistan during the German army's invasion of Russia in World War II. Yershov died in Tashkent in 1943 at the age of 76. His remains were brought back to Russia for reinterment in 1956. 

 Wife: Sofia Vladimirovna Akimova (1887–1972 ) opera singer soprano. Sophia Akimova was born in Tiflis, and received her vocal training under Maria Slavina. She became the wife of fellow opera singer and actor Ivan Vasilievich Ershov (1867–1943). Sofia performed as a soloist with the Marinskii Theatre in Petrograd, and was later appointed a professor of music at the Leningrad Conservatory.
 Son: Igor Ivanovich Ershov (1916–1985). Painter and graphic designer. He was born into an artistic family; his father Ivan Ershov was an opera singer with the Imperial Marinskii Theatre and his mother was both a singer and a professor at the St Petersburg Conservatoire.
In 1932, Ershov began his studies at the academy of Painting, Sculpture and Architecture. Amongst his professors were I.Brodsky and I.Bilibin, the masters of the «silver age» of Russian paintings. His studies were interrupted by the Second World War when he was evacuated to Tashkent. Ershov graduated from the Academy in 1947, presenting lithographs for A. Pushkin's Bronze Horseman. In 1949, a jubilee edition of Pushkin's works was published with illustrations by the artist. From the 1950s onwards, he worked mainly as an illustratorof children's books. At least two generations of Russian children grew up reading Khorovod with Ershov's illustrations. His illustrations for the Russian folk tales by Charles Perrault and Aleksandr Pushkin were very popular; The tale of the Golden Cockerel (1957-1960), A tale of the Fisherman and his wife (1956–57), Russian fairy-tales (1957–1960). Ershov also illustrated the books of contemporary poets such as M.Dudin, E.Rein, and G.Sapgir. The total publication of Ershov's children's books exceeds 1.2 million copies.
Ershov's works can be found in the collections of a number of Russian museums including the State Russian Museum and Museum of A.S. Pushkin and in museums and private collections in both France and England.

 Xenia Krivocheine (bio provided by the granddaughter ) Paris "Une atmosphère de conte de fées" https://web.archive.org/web/20120407123403/http://www.egliserusse.eu/blogdiscussion/Une-atmosphere-de-conte-de-fees_a680.html

Recordings and assessment
Although his career was almost completely confined to Russia, Yershov is considered to have been one of the very best operatic tenors of the past 125 years, on a par with the likes of Jean de Reszke, Francesco Tamagno, Enrico Caruso, Lauritz Melchior, Beniamino Gigli and Jussi Björling. His enormous reputation is supported by a handful of acoustic discs which he made in Saint Petersburg for Columbia Records and the Gramophone and Typewriter Company in 1903, most of which are now available on CD reissues. These recordings consist of some Russian songs and a few operatic arias by Giacomo Meyerbeer, Richard Wagner and Giuseppe Verdi. Despite their sonic limitations, caused by the technological limitations of the day, they show that he possessed a powerful, steady, pure-toned voice of wide compass with clarion high notes and a formidable technique.

Yershov was praised, too, for his theatrical make-up skills and vivid stage presence. His acting was said to be on the same level as that of his celebrated contemporary, the bass Feodor Chaliapin.

 Mariia Platonova’s 1902 letter to Ershov illustrates how opera contributed to self-realization and gave embodiment to exalted, authenticating
confession. Platonova exhilaratingly wrote: “O Siegfried! Siegfried! Child of the world! Siegfried—joy, hope of the earth! Giver of life, radiant hero!” How much light, truth, and beauty there is in you, pure and youthful! You showed us young people what youth and life means. . . . You expressed it . . . through your person . . . gave a living, concrete picture, fulfilled a vague desire . . . I feel myself and my words to be small and pathetic before Siegfried . . . I want to pray before your creation and your talent. . . . I believe that there is a God, that he is great, having given us . . . aspiration to goodness and beauty, having given us your talent. . . . I view my entire life through fantasies, chasing
after dreams and pursuing the most romantic ideals, the questions . . . of life . . . [Y]ou have riveted my interest and sympathy with the greatness
of your personality.(Rossiiskaia natsionalnaia biblioteka (RNB), f. 275 (personal fond of Ivan Vasilievich Ershov), op. 1, d. 68, ll. 1–2 (letter from Mariia Sergeevna Platonova, daughter of the academic S. F. Platonov, to Ershov).
Anna Fishzon " Slavic Review" 70, no. 4 (Winter 2011)

References
Calendar events from life of Ivan Yershov 
Tenor: History of a Voice, by John Potter; Yale University Press, New Haven & London, 2009. 
The Record of Singing, Volume 1, by Michael Scott; Duckworth, London, 1977. 
The Concise Oxford Dictionary of Opera (second edition), by Harold Rosenthal and John Warrack; Oxford University Press, London, 1980.
The Grand Tradition, by John Steane; Duckworth, London, 1974. 
  Liner notes to Tenors of Imperial Russia - Volume 1, produced by Keith Hardwick and Roger Beardsley; Pearl CD, GEM 0217, 2004.
  Anna Fishzon: The Operatics of Everyday Life, or, How Authenticity Was Defined in Late Imperial Russia, "Slavic Review" 70, no. 4 (Winter 2011)
 Anna Fishzon: Fandom, Authenticity, and Opera: Mad Acts and Letter Scenes in Fin-de-Siècle Russia USA September 2013
 Ivan Yershov. Tenor. Opera arias. Romances https://www.amazon.com/Yershov-Tenor-Opera-arias-Romances/dp/5061563271
 Ivan Yershov. Tenor. Romantic Repertoire http://www.compozitor.spb.ru/eng/catalogue_editions/the_regular/index.php?ELEMENT_ID=9862
 Ivan Ershov Le Prophète Drinking song Columbia Phonograph enregistré en 1903 réédité sur LP par Melodiya M 10 45189 001 https://www.youtube.com/watch?v=bl7gF1FLUlU
 Portrait of Ivan Ershov  1908 - The State Tretyakov Gallery Moscow  http://www.tez-rus.net/ViewGood22136.html
 Portrait of Ivan Ershov 1905 - Boris Kustodiev  http://www.wikiart.org/ru/boris-kustodiev/portrait-of-a-singer-i-v-ershov-1905
 Portrait of Ivan Ershov 1922 - Boris Kustodiev  http://www.wikiart.org/ru/boris-kustodiev/portrait-of-i-v-ershov-1922

External links 
History of the Tenor - Sound Clips and Narration
 Boris Kustodiev - Portrait of Ivan Yershov, the role of Siegfried http://www.wikiart.org/en/boris-kustodiev/portrait-of-ivan-yershov-the-role-of-siegfried-1908
 Tsarskoe Selo and town of Pushkin. The digital chronological reference book/Pushkin personality http://www.encspb.ru/object/2804032868?lc=en
 Wagnerians – Ivan Ershov, Lotte Lehmann, Leo Slezak, Kirsten Flagstad, Marjorie Lawrence & Lauritz Melchior http://www.diarci.com/2012/08/07/some-great-wagnerians/

1867 births
1943 deaths
People from Novocherkassk
Russian operatic tenors
Saint Petersburg Conservatory alumni
19th-century male opera singers from the Russian Empire
20th-century Russian male opera singers
Burials at Tikhvin Cemetery